The Circumstance (Italian: La Circonstanza) is a 1973 film written and directed by Ermanno Olmi. The film received a special mention at the 1974 San Sebastián International Film Festival.

Plot 
Laura, a lawyer who comes from an upper-class Milanese family, leads an altogether placid life. After witnessing an almost-fatal motorcycle accident near her family's country home, she becomes obsessed with the young victim, leading to a series of flashbacks and introspective instants that probe the bourgeois life she leads.

Reception 
The film has been praised by critic Derek Elley as a "romantic highpoint in [Ermanno] Olmi’s oeuvre” and “his most accomplished piece of work.”

Cast 
Ada Savelli - Laura

Gaetano Porro - Laura's husband

Massimo Tabak - Beppe, Laura's eldest son

Raffaella Bianichi - Silvia

Mario Sireci - Tommaso

External links 

 
 The Circumstance on AllMovie

References

1973 films
Italian drama films
1973 drama films
1970s Italian films